Palmer Crawford "Pal" Rakes (born in Tampa, Florida) is an American country music singer. He recorded for Warner Bros. Records between 1977 and 1979, and for Atlantic Records between 1988 and 1989. During his tenure on Warner, he charted in the Top 40 of Hot Country Songs with "That's When the Lyin' Stops (And the Lovin' Starts)" and "Till I Can't Take It Anymore". Rakes also released one album for Atlantic, Midnight Rain. One of Rakes's songs appeared on Neal McCoy's debut album At This Moment.

Discography

Albums

Singles

References

American country singer-songwriters
Atlantic Records artists
Living people
Musicians from Tampa, Florida
Warner Records artists
Singer-songwriters from Florida
Country musicians from Florida
Year of birth missing (living people)